Elections to Runnymede Council were held on 4 May 2006. One third of the council was up for election and the Conservative Party stayed in overall control of the council.

After the election, the composition of the council was:
Conservative 36
Runnymede Residents Association 6

Election result

Ward results

References
2006 Runnymede election result
Ward results

2006
2006 English local elections
2000s in Surrey